This is a list of deserts sorted by the region of the world in which the desert is located.

Africa 

 Kalahari Desert – a desert covering much of Botswana and parts of Namibia and South Africa
 Karoo Desert – a desert covering parts of southern South Africa
 Namib Desert – a desert in present-day Namibia
 Danakil Desert – a desert lying in the Afar Triangle and covering northeastern Ethiopia, southern Eritrea, southern Djibouti and northwesternmost Somalia
 Eritrean Coastal Desert – a desert lying along the southern part of the coast of Eritrea and the coast of Djibouti
 Guban Desert – a desert lying along the coast of northwestern Somalia
 Grand Bara Desert – a desert covering parts of south Djibouti
 Chalbi Desert – a desert in northern Kenya along the border with Ethiopia
 Nyiri Desert – a desert located in southern Kenya along the border with Tanzania
 Lompoul Desert – a desert lying in northwestern Senegal between Dakar and Saint-Louis
 Sahara Desert – Africa's largest desert and the world's largest hot desert which covers much of North Africa comprising:
 Ténéré – a desert covering northeastern Niger and western Chad
 Tanezrouft – a desert covering northern Mali, northwestern Niger as well as central and southern Algeria, at the west of the Hoggar Mountains
 El Djouf – a desert which covers northeastern Mauritania and parts of northwestern Mali
 Djurab Desert – a desert covering northern central Chad
 Tin-Toumma Desert – a desert covering southeastern Niger, at the south of the Ténéré
 Libyan Desert (also called Western Desert) – a desert covering eastern Libya, western Egypt and northwestern Sudan at the west of the Nile River
 White Desert – a desert covering a part of western Egypt and located in Farafra, Egypt
 Eastern Desert – a desert covering eastern Egypt and northeastern Sudan between the Nile River and the Red Sea
 Nubian Desert – a desert covering northeastern Sudan between the Nile River and the Red Sea
 Bayuda Desert – a desert covering eastern Sudan located just at the southwest of the Nubian Desert
 Sinai Desert – a desert located on the Sinai Peninsula in Egypt
 Atlantic Coastal Desert – a desert lying along the western coast of the Sahara Desert and occupies a narrow strip in Western Sahara and Mauritania

Asia 
 Arabian Desert – desert complex on the Arabian Peninsula comprising:
 Al Khatim Desert – a desert near Abu Dhabi
 Al-Dahna Desert – a desert being the main central division of the Arabian Desert and covering parts of Saudi Arabia
 Empty Quarter – the world's largest sand desert and covering much of Saudi Arabia, Oman, the United Arab Emirates and Yemen
 Nefud Desert – a desert in northern part of the Arabian Peninsula
 Ramlat al-Sab`atayn – a desert in north-central Yemen
 Wahiba Sands – a desert covering great parts of Oman
 Judaean Desert – a desert in eastern Israel and the West Bank
 Negev – a desert located in southern Israel
 Bromo Sand Sea – a volcanic desert in Bromo Tengger Semeru National Park, East Java, Indonesia
 Dasht-e Kavir – a desert in central Iran
 Dasht-e Lut – a large salt desert in southeastern Iran
 Polond Desert – a desert in eastern Iran
 Maranjab Desert – a desert in central Iran
 Katpana Desert – a cold desert in Pakistan
 Indus Valley Desert – a desert located in Pakistan
 Kharan desert – a desert located in Pakistan
 Syrian desert – a desert located in Syria, Jordan and Iraq
 Thal Desert – a desert in Pakistan
 Thar Desert – a desert in India and Pakistan
 Cholistan Desert – a desert in Pakistan
 Dasht-e-Margo – a desert in southwestern Afghanistan
 Kyzyl Kum – a desert in Kazakhstan and Uzbekistan
 Kara Kum – a large desert in Central Asia
 Lop Desert – a desert in China
 Ordos – a desert in northern China
 Kubuqi Desert – a desert in northern China
 Mu Us Desert – a desert in northern China
 Gobi – a desert in Mongolia and China
 Badain Jaran Desert – a desert in China
 Hami Desert – a desert in China
 Tengger Desert – a desert in China
 Taklamakan – a desert located in China
 Gurbantünggüt Desert – a desert located in northwestern China
 Kumtag Desert – a desert in northwestern China
 Karapinar Desert – a desert in Southern Central Anatolia

Europe

Spain 
 Bardenas Reales – a semi-arid desert in Navarre, Spain (455 km2)
 Cabo de Gata-Níjar Natural Park
 Monegros Desert – a semi-arid desert in Aragón, Spain
 Tabernas Desert – a semi-arid desert in Almería, Spain (280 km2)

Other European nations 
 Błędów Desert – a desert in Poland
 Highlands of Iceland – the interior plateau of Iceland; not a desert by climate, but effectively one because precipitation penetrates the volcanic soil so quickly that the land is infertile (20,000 km2)
 Ryn Desert – a desert in western Kazakhstan and southwestern Russia
 Oltenian Sahara - a desert in Dolj County, Oltenia, Romania

North America 

 Chihuahua Desert a desert in Mexico and the United States
 Great Basin Desert
 Black Rock Desert
 Death Valley
 Mojave Desert a desert in the United States
 Red Desert (Wyoming)
 Sonoran Desert a desert in the United States and Mexico
 Colorado Desert
 Gran Desierto de Altar
 Thompson Plateau a desert in Canada

Oceania

Australia 

 Central Desert – a central Australian desert
 Gibson Desert – a central Australian desert
 Great Sandy Desert – a northwestern Australian desert
 Great Victoria Desert – the biggest desert in Australia
 Little Sandy Desert – a western Australian desert
 Simpson Desert – a central Australian desert
 Strzelecki Desert – a south-central Australian desert
 Tanami Desert – a northern Australian desert

New Zealand
 Rangipo Desert – a barren desert-like plateau (with 1.5–2.5 m/yr rainfall) on the North Island Volcanic Plateau in New Zealand

South America 

 Atacama Desert – a desert in Chile and Peru
 La Guajira Desert – a desert in northern Colombia and Venezuela
 Monte Desert – in Argentina, a smaller desert above the Patagonian Desert
 Patagonian Desert – the largest desert in the Americas, located in Argentina
 Sechura Desert – a desert located south of the Piura Region of Peru
 Jalapão – a desert park in Tocantins, Brazil

Polar regions

Antarctic 
 Antarctic Desert – the largest desert in the world
 Meyer Desert – a small desert close to the South Pole

Arctic 
 Arctic Desert – the second largest "desert" in the world, though it consists of frozen ocean, land ice, and tundra, so (like the rest of this section) not a desert climate in any conventional sense
 North American Arctic – a large tundra in Northern America
 Greenland – mostly covered by land ice, like Antarctica
 Russian Arctic – a large tundra in Russia

Pseudo-deserts 
Some geographical features are referred to as "deserts", and this word may even feature in their names, despite not meeting any meteorological definitions for a desert.

 Accona Desert – area of Siena, Italy.
 Barreiro da Faneca – clayey expanse in the Azores.
 Błędowska Desert – area of sands in Poland.
 Carcross Desert – sand-dune system in Yukon, Canada.
 Chara Sands – region of Siberia, Russia.
 Deliblatska Peščara – sand expanse in Vojvodina, Serbia.
 Desert of Maine – 40-acre expanse of glacial sand-dunes in Maine, United States.
 Desert of Wales – a large, upland area of Wales.
 Dunas dos Ingleses – sand-dune system in Brazil.
 Dungeness – single expanse in South East England, United Kingdom, misleadingly nicknamed "Britain's only desert".
 Joaquina Beach – beach in Brazil.
 Kaʻū Desert – an area of desertification in Hawaii, due to the acid rainfall caused by the nearby Kīlauea volcano.
 Larzac – limestone karst plateau in the south of the Massif Central, France.
 Lençóis Maranhenses National Park
 Melnik Desert Canyon – a canyon in Bulgaria.
 Oleshky Sands – sands in Kherson Oblast, Ukraine.
 Oltenian Sahara – area of desertification in Oltenia, Romania.
 The Stone Desert – rock formation in Bulgaria.
 Red Desert – desert-like region in South Africa.
 Sand dunes of Lemnos – sand-dune expanse on Lemnos, Greece.
 Sands of Đurđevac – sand-dune system in Croatia.
 Sleeping Bear Dunes – lakeshore in Michigan, United States.
 Słowiński National Park – sand-dune expanse in Poland.
 Tottori Sand Dunes – sand-dune system in Tottori Prefecture, Japan.

See also 
 Desert
 Desertification
 List of deserts by area
 Polar desert
 Tundra

References 

Lists of landforms
 
Geography-related lists